Penafiel is a town and a parish in Penafiel Municipality in Portugal. The population in 2011 was 15,552, in an area of 22.52 km². Penafiel has its own station on the Douro railway line.

Industry
AJP Motos, a motorcycle manufacturing company founded in 1987 by António Pinto and Jorge Pinto, is based in Penafiel.

References

Freguesias of Penafiel
Towns in Portugal